East Siberian economic region (Vostochno-Sibirsky ekonomichesky rayon) is one of twelve economic regions of Russia.

In this area of plateaus, mountains, and river basins, the major cities—Krasnoyarsk and Irkutsk—are located along the Trans-Siberian Railroad. There are hydroelectric stations at Bratsk, Krasnoyarsk, and Irkutsk.  Coal, gold, graphite, iron ore, aluminum ore, zinc, and lead are mined in the area, and livestock is raised.

Composition

Socio-economic indicators
The East Siberian economic region accounted for 4 per cent of the national GRP in 2008. This sparsely populated region between Europe and Asia has high wage levels and also a relatively large portion of employees in the new private sector. Productivity is also high by Russian standards.

It ranks especially low in the migration of people into the region and population change, and in the expectation of life to improve and evaluation of the national economy.

References

Economic regions of Russia
Economy of Siberia